Marjorie Jackson-Nelson  (13 September 1931)  is a former Governor of South Australia and a former Australian athlete. She finished her sporting career with two Olympic and seven Commonwealth Games Gold Medals, six individual world records and every Australian State and National title she contested from 1950–1954.

Biography 
Jackson was born in Coffs Harbour, New South Wales, and first gained fame when she defeated reigning Olympic 100 and 200 metres champion Fanny Blankers-Koen a number of times in 1949, thus earning the nickname "the Lithgow Flash", after the New South Wales town of Lithgow where she lived and had grown up.

Having won four titles at the 1950 British Empire Games, Jackson came as a favourite to the Helsinki 1952 Summer Olympics.  She won both the 100 m, in a then-world-record-equalling time of 11.5, and the 200 m, winning the first Olympic athletics track titles for Australia since Edwin Flack in 1896. Having more strong runners in the team (consisting of Shirley Strickland, Winsome Crisps and Verna Johnston in addition to Jackson), the Australian 4 × 100 m relay team was also a favourite for the gold, but a faulty exchange meant Jackson's chances for third gold medal were gone. The Americans, anchored by Catherine Hardy (later Lavender), won in an upset, setting a new world record time of 45.9 seconds. Later in 1952, Jackson lowered the 100 m world record time to 11.4, running this new record in a meet at Gifu, Japan on 4 October 1952.

In 1953 Jackson married Olympic cyclist Peter Nelson. After his death from leukaemia in 1977, she launched the Peter Nelson Leukaemia Research Fellowship. Now named Jackson-Nelson, she was one of the eight flag-bearers of the Olympic Flag at the opening ceremony of the 2000 Summer Olympics in Sydney. She also has a road named in honour of her at the Sydney Olympic Park, beside the Sydney Superdome (now Qudos Bank Arena).

Governor
In late 2001, Jackson-Nelson was appointed Governor of South Australia; she held the post until 31 July 2007. On 15 March 2006, Jackson-Nelson was one of the final four runners who carried the Queen's Baton around the MCG stadium during the 2006 Commonwealth Games Opening Ceremony in Melbourne.  On 6 June 2007, shortly before the end of her tenure, it was announced that the planned replacement for the Royal Adelaide Hospital would be named the "Marjorie Jackson-Nelson Hospital". On 18 February 2009, amidst criticism of the new hospital development, Jackson-Nelson asked that her name not be used.

Honours 

 1953: Member of the Order of the British Empire (MBE) in the Coronation Honours for her service to women's athletics.
 1985: Induction into the Sport Australia Hall of Fame
 2001: Companion of the Order of Australia (AC) upon appointment as governor.
 2002: Commander of the Royal Victorian Order (CVO) in February 2002 during Queen Elizabeth II's visit to South Australia.
 2007: Olympic Order, the highest order bestowed by the International Olympic Committee.  The citation from the IOC stated that the award was made for her "having illustrated the Olympic ideal through her actions, having achieved remarkable merit in the sporting world and having rendered outstanding service to the Olympic movement through her community work and as Governor of South Australia".

She is also a Dame of the Order of St John of Jerusalem and a Freeman of the City of London. In 1993, the State Transit Authority of New South Wales named a Sydney RiverCat ferry after Jackson-Nelson.

References

Bibliography

External links

 Biography at the Governor of South Australia website
 Peter Nelson Leukaemia Research Fellowship Fund
 

1931 births
Living people
People from Coffs Harbour
Australian female sprinters
Olympic female sprinters
Olympic athletes of Australia
Olympic gold medalists for Australia
Olympic gold medalists in athletics (track and field)
Athletes (track and field) at the 1952 Summer Olympics
Medalists at the 1952 Summer Olympics
Commonwealth Games gold medallists for Australia
Commonwealth Games gold medallists in athletics
Athletes (track and field) at the 1950 British Empire Games
Athletes (track and field) at the 1954 British Empire and Commonwealth Games
Sport Australia Hall of Fame inductees
Australian Commanders of the Royal Victorian Order
Australian Members of the Order of the British Empire
Companions of the Order of Australia
Dames of Justice of the Order of St John
Governors of South Australia
Australian Presbyterians
Commonwealth Games competitors for Australia
Sportswomen from New South Wales
Medallists at the 1954 British Empire and Commonwealth Games